This is an incomplete list of some of the more famous Grand Mosques around the world.

List

See also
Jama Masjid

 !
 Famous